Elizabeth Bonnin (born 16 September 1976) is a French science, wildlife and natural history presenter, who has worked on television in both Ireland and the United Kingdom. She presented morning show RI:SE and music show Top of the Pops in the early 2000s.

She is best known for presenting wildlife and science programmes including Galapagos, How the Earth Works, Animals in Love, Stargazing Live, Blue Planet Live, Cats v Dogs: Which is Best? and Should We Close Our Zoos?. She co-presented the BBC factual series Bang Goes the Theory from 2009 until 2014 and since 2013, has co-presented Countrywise for ITV. In 2019, she presented "Meat: A Threat to our Planet?". She is regarded as one of the most prominent natural world presenters in Britain.

Early life and education
Bonnin was born in Paris to a Trinidadian mother, of Indian and Portuguese descent, and a French-Martiniquan father, who was a dentist. Her family moved to Ireland when she was nine years old.

Bonnin has a bachelor's degree in biochemistry from Trinity College Dublin, She also holds a master's degree in wild animal biology and conservation from the Zoological Society of London and the Royal Veterinary College (2008), for which she tracked tigers in Nepal. She continues to work on big cat conservation programmes at the Zoological Society of London.

Career
Bonnin began her career singing backing vocals with The Pale before joining an Irish girl pop group named Chill, who signed to Polydor but broke up before recording. The band had performed on Dustin the Turkey's third album Faith of Our Feathers, duetting on "We Are Family". She was offered a job hosting the IRMA Awards which led to presenting roles on RTÉ Television in Ireland, on The Den, Telly Bingo, Millennium Eve: Celebrate 2000 and for two years, Off the Rails with Fiona McShane. At the time she was in a relationship with the publisher John Ryan. In 2002, she moved to London to present on a number of TV channels.

In 2002, she became one of the presenters of the Channel 4 morning show RI:SE, specialising in reporting on entertainment-related stories. In the same year she became a regular presenter on Top of the Pops in the UK.

In 2004, Bonnin was locked in a giant kennel along with MPs Paul Burstow, Evan Harris and Ivan Henderson and actress Liza Goddard, BBC Newsround presenter Lizzie Greenwood and DJ Becky Jago in a stunt to launch the annual RSPCA Week to raise awareness and funds.

Since 2005, Bonnin has been involved in science broadcasting. She presented the show Gadgets, Gadgets, Gadgets in 2005 and co-presented the BBC science series Bang Goes the Theory on BBC One from 2009 until 2014. In 2008, Bonnin presented a documentary series Science Friction on RTÉ One which looked at taboos in discussions of scientific topics (such as paedophilia and nuclear power) in Ireland. She also contributed to BBC Two's series on the work of the London Natural History Museum, Museum of Life.

In October 2010, she joined the cast of Autumnwatch and in January 2011, she presented segments of BBC Two's Stargazing Live from various areas of Hawaii including atop Mauna Kea. In May 2011, she co-presented BBC One's Egypt's Lost Cities.

Her programme on animal intelligence, Super Smart Animals, was filmed in mid-2011 in Mexico, Brazil, Thailand, Australia and Germany, and broadcast in February 2012. Bonin has presented several Horizon specials on BBC Two which have covered topics ranging from looking at the future of technology to reporting on the sustainability of zoos.

In June 2013 she presented the two-part documentary Operation Snow Tiger, working alongside Russian and other scientists in the Ussuriysk Reserve in the Russian Far East. Since 2013 Bonnin has been a presenter of the ITV series Countrywise, alongside Paul Heiney and Ben Fogle. In November 2013 she presented Animal Odd Couples on BBC One. She was a co-presenter along with Martin Pepper on the series How the Earth Works that aired on the Discovery Channel in the USA starting on 10 September 2013.

In October 2014 she presented a three-part Horizon series looking into the life of cats.  In February 2015 she presented a two-part documentary series called Animals in Love on BBC One, looking at the emotional lives of animals including elephants, monkeys, geese and alligators.

In August 2015, alongside Matt Baker and Steve Backshall, she co-hosted a series of three programmes for BBC One, Big Blue Live, featuring marine life in Monterey Bay, California. Early 2016 saw Bonnin return to Stargazing Live, where she reported from the European Space Agency's astronaut training centre. She also co-presented the BBC Two series Cats v Dogs: Which is Best? with Chris Packham.

Starting on 30 March 2017, Bonnin presented a new BBC One series called Galapagos exploring the species found on the islands and in the seas around. In July 2017, she co-presented Wild Alaska Live with Matt Baker and Steve Backshall on BBC One. In 2018, Bonnin presented a one-off documentary for BBC One called Drowning In Plastic, looking at the problem of marine plastic pollution. In 2020 she presented a programme looking at different species of Penguins titled Penguins: Meet the Family.

Personal life
Bonnin grew up with her older sister Benni, while she said that "I was extremely close to my granny, who passed away in 2003." She has moved back to London. Bonnin featured on the BBC's Who Do You Think You Are? on 8 December 2016. In the programme she traced the ancestry of both her parents on the Caribbean islands of Trinidad and Martinique.

Bonnin is a role model for EDF Energy's Pretty Curious programme, which is aimed at encouraging teenage girls to study science-based subjects at school. She has said in a 2016 interview, "FHM offered me a spread but I said no."

On 5 January 2021, Bonnin announced that her mother Bonnie Murray had died over the Christmas 2020 period after contracting COVID-19.

Filmography
Television

References

External links

1976 births
20th-century Irish women singers
Alumni of the Royal Veterinary College
Alumni of Trinity College Dublin
British women television presenters
The Den (TV programme) presenters
French biochemists
French conservationists
French emigrants to Ireland
French people of Indian descent
French people of Martiniquais descent
French people of Portuguese descent
French people of Trinidad and Tobago descent
French pop singers
French women biologists
Living people
RTÉ television presenters
Science communicators
Singers from Dublin (city)
Top of the Pops presenters
Zoological Society of London
People educated at Mount Anville Secondary School